Carrington Tanner Marshall (June 17, 1869 – June 28, 1958) was a lawyer from Zanesville, Ohio, United States who served for twelve years as Chief Justice of the Ohio Supreme Court, and was later a judge at the Nuremberg Trials.

Biography
Carrington T. Marshall was born near Zanesville, Ohio June 17, 1869. He attended a one-room country school, and rode seven miles a day to attend high school in Zanesville. He taught school for three years, and was a bookkeeper. In 1892, he graduated from the Cincinnati Law School, and began a practice at Zanesville.

The first office Marshall held was Chief Justice of the Ohio Supreme Court. He was nominated by the Republicans to run against incumbent Democrat Hugh L. Nichols. He won election in November 1920. The University of Cincinnati awarded him an honorary Doctor of Law in 1925. Marshall won re-election in 1926, but lost to Carl V. Weygandt in 1932.

After leaving the bench, Marshall established a practice in Columbus, Ohio. He wrote a number of books. In 1947, he served as presiding judge of the Judges' Trial (The United States of America vs. Josef Altstötter, et al.), one of twelve trials for war crimes held before U.S. military courts in Nuremberg in 1947. He was appointed February 13, 1947 by General Lucius D. Clay of the Office of Military Government for Germany. Due to illness, Marshall resigned June 19, 1947 and returned to Ohio.

Marshall died June 30, 1958 at home in Bexley, Ohio. He was buried at Zanesville Memorial Park in Zanesville.

Marshall married Dora Foltz in June 1900. They had one daughter.

Publications

History of Courts and Lawyers of Ohio
New Divorce Courts for Old
Liberty Under Laws in America
Law Reforms and Law Reformers

References

External sources

1869 births
1958 deaths
Chief Justices of the Ohio Supreme Court
Judges of the United States Nuremberg Military Tribunals
Ohio Republicans
Lawyers from Columbus, Ohio
People from Zanesville, Ohio
University of Cincinnati College of Law alumni
People from Franklin County, Ohio